Vernon Loton (5 January 1906 – 8 June 1986) was an Australian cricketer. He played two first-class matches for Western Australia in 1925/26.

See also
 List of Western Australia first-class cricketers

References

External links
 

1906 births
1986 deaths
Australian cricketers
Western Australia cricketers